Count Wilhelm Mauritz Klingspor (7 December 1744 – 15 May 1814) was a Swedish noble military officer and one of the Lords of the Realm. He is probably best known from his time as field marshal of Finland during the Finnish War and for participating in the coup that dethroned Gustav IV of Sweden.

1744 births
1814 deaths
Field marshals of Sweden
Swedish military personnel of the Finnish War
18th-century Swedish military personnel
19th-century Swedish military personnel

Wilhelm
Swedish counts